Prototheora is a genus of moths. It is the only genus of the Prototheoridae, or the African primitive ghost moths, a family of insects in the lepidopteran order, contained in the superfamily Hepialoidea. These moths are endemic to Southern Africa.

Diversity and distribution
Members of the genus Prototheora are found in South Africa (Kristensen, 1999: 60; Nielsen et al., 2000), Angola (Prototheora angolae) and the Mulanje Massif of Malawi (Davis, 2001). See also revisions by Janse (1942) and Davis (1996).

List of species
Prototheora parachlora (Meyrick, 1919) (originally in Metatheora)
=Prototheora paraglossa; Janse, 1942
Prototheora petrosema Meyrick, 1917
Prototheora monoglossa Meyrick, 1924
Prototheora corvifera (Meyrick, 1920) (originally in Metatheora)
Prototheora merga Davis, 1996
Prototheora quadricornis Meyrick, 1920
Prototheora biserrata Davis, 1996
Prototheora serruligera Meyrick, 1920
Prototheora cooperi Janse, 1942
Prototheora geniculata Davis, 1996
Prototheora drackensbergae Davis, 1996
Prototheora angolae Davis, 1996
Prototheora malawiensis Davis, 2001

References

Davis, D.R. (1996). A revision of the southern African family Prototheoridae (Lepidoptera: Hepialoidea). Entomologica Scandinavica, 27: 393-439.
Davis, D.R. (2001). A new species of Prototheora from Malawi, with additional notes on the distribution and morphology of the genus (Lepidoptera: Prototheoridae). Proceedings of the Entomological Society of Washington: 103(2): 452-456.Abstract
Janse, A.J.T. (1942). The moths of South Africa. Volume IV, part 1. Jugatae  78 pp.
Kristensen, N.P. (1999) [1998]. The non-Glossatan Moths. Ch. 4, pp. 41–62  in Kristensen, N.P. (Ed.). Lepidoptera, Moths and Butterflies. Volume 1: Evolution, Systematics, and Biogeography. Handbook of Zoology. A Natural History of the phyla of the Animal Kingdom. Band / Volume IV Arthropoda: Insecta Teilband / Part 35: 491 pp. Walter de Gruyter, Berlin, New York.
Nielsen, E.S., Robinson, G.S. and Wagner, D.L. 2000. Ghost-moths of the world: a global inventory and bibliography of the Exoporia (Mnesarchaeoidea and Hepialoidea) (Lepidoptera) Journal of Natural History, 34(6): 823-878.Abstract

Sources
Common Name Index

External links
LepTree.net
Tree of Life
Wikispecies
Mouthparts

Hepialoidea
Exoporia genera
Taxa named by Edward Meyrick